Monroe Eley was a former running back who played in the Canadian Football League and the National Football League.

Having played his college football with Arizona State University, Eley was not drafted by the NFL, so he headed north to play with the British Columbia Lions. In his first year, 1972, he rushed for 517 yards and led the West Conference with 1033 kickoff return yards. His totals fell in 1973, to 373 rushing yards, as he played behind 1000 rusher Johnny Musso. The next season Musso was injured and Eley had his best year, racking up 1176 yards. His fellow running back, Lou Harris also rushed for 1239 yards, giving the Lions one of the most productive backfields in CFL history.

He wasn't able to reach contract terms with the Lions, so he headed south to the Atlanta Falcons, who had noticed him and drafted him in 1974. In 1975, he played only 6 games, rushing once for 3 yards and mostly returning kicks. In 1977, he played 7 games and rushed for 273 yards, but his average was a low 2.8 yards per carry. This was his final season.

References

1949 births
2019 deaths
American football running backs
Arizona State Sun Devils football players
BC Lions players
Atlanta Falcons players
Canadian football running backs